The garden eels are the subfamily Heterocongrinae in the conger eel family Congridae. The majority of garden eels live in the Indo-Pacific, but species are also found in warmer parts of the Atlantic Ocean (including the Caribbean) and East Pacific. These small eels live in burrows on the sea floor and get their name from their practice of poking their heads from their burrows while most of their bodies remain hidden. Since they tend to live in groups, the many eel heads "growing" from the sea floor resemble the plants in a garden. They vary greatly in colour depending on the exact species involved. Garden eel colonies can grow as large as one acre in surface area.

Species
Based on FishBase, about 10 species of garden eels are in two genera:

 Gorgasia
 Barnes' garden eel B. H. Robison & Lancraft, 1984
 Gorgasia cotroneii (D'Ancona, 1928)
 Galzin's garden eel, Gorgasia galzini Castle & Randall, 1999
 Hawaiian garden eel, Gorgasia hawaiiensis Randall & Chess, 1980
 Gorgasia inferomaculata (Blache, 1977)
 Pacific spaghetti eel, Gorgasia japonica T. Abe, Miki & Asai, 1977
 Klausewitz's garden eel, Gorgasia klausewitzi Quéro & Saldanha, 1995
 Whitespotted garden eel, Gorgasia maculata Klausewitz & Eibl-Eibesfeldt, 1959
 Freckled garden eel, Gorgasia naeocepaea (J. E. Böhlke, 1951)
 Splendid garden eel, Gorgasia preclara J. E. Böhlke & Randall, 1981
 Dotted garden eel, Gorgasia punctata Meek & Hildebrand, 1923
 Gorgasia sillneri Klausewitz, 1962
 Sharp-nose garden eel, Gorgasia taiwanensis K. T. Shao, 1990
 Gorgasia thamani D. W. Greenfield & Niesz, 2004
 Heteroconger
 Heteroconger balteatus Castle & Randall, 1999
 Heteroconger camelopardalis (Lubbock, 1980)
 White-ring garden eel, Heteroconger canabus (G. I. McT. Cowan & Rosenblatt, 1974)
 Heteroconger chapmani (Herre, 1923)
 Cobra garden eel, Heteroconger cobra J. E. Böhlke & Randall, 1981
 Heteroconger congroides (D'Ancona, 1928)
 Pale green eel, Heteroconger digueti (Pellegrin, 1923)
 Enigma garden eel Castle & Randall, 1999
 Spotted garden eel, Heteroconger hassi (Klausewitz & Eibl-Eibesfeldt, 1959)
 Galapagos garden eel, Heteroconger klausewitzi (Eibl-Eibesfeldt & Köster, 1983)
 Masked garden eel, Heteroconger lentiginosus J. E. Böhlke & Randall, 1981
 Brown garden eel, Heteroconger longissimus Günther, 1870
 Yellow garden eel, Heteroconger luteolus D. G. Smith, 1989
 Mercy's garden eel G. R. Allen & Erdmann, 2009
 Obscure garden eel (Klausewitz & Eibl-Eibesfeldt, 1959)
 Mimic garden eel, Heteroconger pellegrini Castle, 1999
 Black garden eel J. E. Böhlke & Randall, 1981
 Zebra garden eel Bleeker, 1868
 Taylor's garden eel Castle & Randall, 1995
 ''Heteroconger tomberua Castle & Randall, 1999
 Tricia's garden eel Castle & Randall, 1999

References

Congridae
Taxa named by Albert Günther